Montrose Regional Airport  is a non-towered public airport on the northwest side of Montrose, in zip code 81401 in southwestern Colorado. Its two runways are at elevation 5,759 feet (1,755 m). MTJ covers 966 acres (391 ha) of land.

Monarch Airlines started flying to Montrose in the 1940s. Successor Frontier Airlines (1950-1986) flew to the present airport since the 1950s; the first jets were Frontier Boeing 737-200s in 1982 (runway 12/30 was then 8500 ft).  Earlier, Frontier flew Convair 580s between Montrose and Denver.

An enhanced and expanded Montrose Regional Airport was dedicated on June 25, 1988, with Chuck Yeager cutting the ribbon. 
The airport terminal was designed by local architect Patrik Davis "to greet visitors with small-town hospitality. A two-sided fireplace is the centerpiece of the passenger seating area, which has a tile floor patterned with the Ute pictogram for travel and a high, skylighted ceiling of knotty pine. The walls are earthy, ground-face cinderblock, and natural-finished glue-laminated beams extend over wide walkways. The gable roof has skylights and dormers decorated with the Hopi good luck symbol."

Its runway 17/35 (10,000 feet in length) was built during the 1990s.

The airport is most busy during its winter season, serving many skiers headed to Telluride Ski Resort, an hour-and-a-half away by road;  it is also busy serving summer tourism in the area.  In 2019, outside the winter and summer seasons, the only major airline flights were United Express flights to Denver and American Eagle flights to Dallas/Fort Worth.  Direct flights to Phoenix, Chicago, Los Angeles, New York, and other cities are offered in peak seasons, with the most flights on Saturdays.

American's service to their hub at New York's LaGuardia Airport only operates on Saturdays in the winter, due to perimeter restrictions at LGA which are only lifted on Saturdays.

Montrose Regional is the nearest airport with regularly scheduled mainline passenger jets to ski areas around Telluride.  Some direct service to Telluride's small airport was offered by Boutique Air in 2018, with Montrose serving as the alternative, backup destination when weather would close the high-elevation Telluride airport.

Airlines and destinations

Passenger

Statistics

Passengers

Top destinations

Airline market share

2010-2011 terminal project
Montrose Regional Airport remodeled and expanded the passenger terminal, adding 10,935 sq. ft. by lengthening the terminal 80 feet to the south. The expansion added space for passenger check-in, larger departure lounge, and space at the security checkpoint.

Based aircraft and operations
In the year ending December 31, 2017, the airport had 36,550 aircraft operations, average 100 per day: 19% air carrier, <1% air taxi, 75% general aviation and 5% military. At the time, there were 81 aircraft based at MTJ, 59 single-engine, 13 multi-engine, two jets, three helicopters, three gliders and one ultra-light.

Major accidents near MTJ
On April 13, 1973, a Continental Airlines North American Sabreliner on a positioning flight crashed shortly after takeoff when a thrust reverser deployed in flight, and both occupants on board were killed.
On November 28, 2004, a Global Aviation Canadair CL-600 with six occupants on board crashed shortly after takeoff due to ice and snow contamination on the wings. Two crew members and one passenger died.

References

External links
 

Airports in Colorado
Transportation buildings and structures in Montrose County, Colorado
Montrose, Colorado